Epitonium is a genus of small predatory sea snails, marine gastropod mollusks. Epitonium is the type genus of the family Epitoniidae, the wentletraps.

The common name wentletraps is derived from the Dutch word wenteltrap, denoting a spiral staircase. This refers to the striking form and sculpture of the shells of the mollusks in this genus, and to a lesser extent, the whole family. 

The genus Epitonium has been divided in the past by some authors into several subgenera, but these subgenera were based only on shell characters and did not reflect the true underlying relationships or phylogeny.

Shell description
Epitonium shells are high-spired, and are all-white in most of the species within this genus. A few species are tinted with brown to varying degrees, or have a brown stripe on the shoulder of the whorl. The shells typically have blade-like vertical ribs, known as costae.

Habitat
Wentletraps usually live in sand near sea anemones or corals.

Life habits
These snails are predators and feed by inserting their proboscis and biting out small pieces of the anemone's tissues. Some species of wentletrap feed on only one species of sea anemone, in other words they are species-specific in terms of their prey.

Synonymised genera
Many species that now are placed in the genus Epitonium have, over the years, been classified in other genera. These have become synonyms of Epitonium :

 Aciona Leach, 1815
 Acutiscala de Boury, 1909
 Amiciscala Jousseaume, 1912
 Anguliscala de Boury, 1909
 Asperiscala de Boury, 1909 
 Avalitiscala de Boury, 1912
 Cinctiscala de Boury, 1909
 Cirratiscala de Boury, 1909)
 Clathrus Oken, 1815
 Connexiscala de Boury, 1909
 Crenuliscala Iredale, 1936
 Crisposcala de Boury, 1886
 Cyclostoma Lamarck, 1799
 Decussiscala de Boury, 1909 
 Delicatiscala de Boury, 1909
 Dulciscala de Boury, 1909
 Eburniscala de Boury, 1909
 Epitonium (Asperiscala) de Boury, 1909
 Epitonium (Clathrus)
 Epitonium (Epitonium) Röding, 1798 · accepted, alternate representation
 Epitonium (Hyaloscala) de Boury, 1889 · accepted, alternate representation
 Epitonium (Papyriscala) de Boury, 1909  accepted, alternate representation
 Evolutiscala de Boury, 1909
 Firmiscala de Boury, 1909
 Folaceiscala de Boury, 1912
 Foliaceiscala de Boury, 1912
 Foraceiscala de Boury, 1911
 Foveoscala de Boury, 1909
 Fragiliscala Azuma, 1962
 Fusicoscala Monterosato, 1890
 Glabriscala de Boury, 1909
 Graciliscala de Boury, 1909
 Gradatiscala de Boury, 1909
 Gyroscala (Fragiliscala) Azuma, 1962
 Hirtoscala Monterosato, 1890
 Hyaloscala de Boury, 1890
 Innesiscala Jousseaume, 1912
 Janthoscala Mörch, 1875
 Labeoscala de Boury, 1912
 Laeviscala de Boury, 1909
 Lamelliscala de Boury, 1909
 Lepidiscala de Boury, 1909
 Limiscala de Boury, 1909
 Limniscala Dollfus, 1913
 Linctoscala Monterosato, 1890
 Lineoscala de Boury, 1909
 Mazescala Iredale, 1936
 Melanopsis Férussac, 1807
 Minutiscala de Boury, 1909
 Nipponoscala Masahito & Habe, 1973
 Nitidiscala de Boury, 1909
 Nitidoscala Strong, 1930
 Papyriscala de Boury, 1909
 Parviscala de Boury, 1887
 Perlucidiscala de Boury, 1912
 Pudentiscala Iredale, 1938
 Pupiscala Masahito, Kuroda & Habe, 1971
 Resticuliscala Cossmann, 1912
 Reticuliscala de Boury, 1909
 Scala Mörch, 1852
 Scala (Innesiscala) de Boury in Jousseaume, 1912
 Scala (Perlucidiscala) de Boury in Jousseaume, 1912
 Scalaria Lamarck, 1801
 Scalaria (Parviscala) de Boury, 1887 
 Scalarus Montfort, 1810 (Unjustified emendation of Scalaria)
 Scalatarius Duméril, 1806
 Sodaliscala de Boury, 1909
 Sphaeroscala Monterosato, 1890
 Spiniscala de Boury, 1909
 Turbiniscala de Boury, 1909
 Viciniscala de Boury, 1909

Species

Species within the genus Epitonium include:

Note: Some malacologists have recently placed many of the more than 600 named species into other genera, which were previously considered to be subgenera of the genus Epitonium. On the other hand, many species that belonged to subgenera of Epitonium are now included in Epitonium. These subgenera were based on details of the shell sculpture and  not on molecular analysis.

 Epitonium abyssicola (Schepman, 1909)
 Epitonium acanthopleurum (Verco, 1906)
 Epitonium acapulcanum Dall, 1917
 Epitonium actinariophilum (Masahito & Habe 1976)
 Epitonium aculeatum  (G. B. Sowerby II, 1844)
 Epitonium adjunctum (Jousseaume, 1912)
 Epitonium aequale (Thiele, 1925)
 Epitonium agitabile (Jousseaume, 1912)
 Epitonium alabiforme Kilburn, 1985
 Epitonium alatum  (G. B. Sowerby II, 1844)
 Epitonium albidum (d'Orbigny, 1842) - bladed wentletrap
 Epitonium albolineatum (G. B. Sowerby II, 1844)
 Epitonium algerianum (Weinkauff, 1866)
 Epitonium alizonum (Melvill, 1912)
 Epitonium amathusium (Melvill & Standen, 1903)
 Epitonium amicum (Jousseaume, 1894)
 Epitonium amiculum Kilburn, 1985
 Epitonium amplexus Nakayama, 2003
 Epitonium anabathmos Kilburn, 1985
 Epitonium ancillotoi Cossignani T. & Cossignani V., 1998
 Epitonium angulatum (Say, 1830) - angulate wentletrap
 Epitonium angulicinctum (de Boury, 1913)
 Epitonium antisoa (Iredale, 1936)
 Epitonium apiculatum (Dall, 1889) - semismooth wentletrap
 Epitonium aranea Bonfitto, 2017
 Epitonium arcanum DuShane, 1979
 Epitonium artimi (Jousseaume, 1912)
 Epitonium atomus (E. A. Smith, 1890)
 Epitonium attenuatum (Sowerby, J. de C., 1874)
 Epitonium audouini (Jousseaume, 1894)
 Epitonium aureomaculatum (Masahito & Habe, 1973)
 Epitonium auritum (G. B. Sowerby II, 1844)
 Epitonium austrocaledonicum (Montrouzier, 1859)
 Epitonium avalites (Jousseaume, 1912)
 Epitonium babylonium (Dall, 1889) - tower wentletrap
 Epitonium barissum (Iredale, 1936)
 Epitonium beachportense (Cotton & Godfrey, 1938)
 Epitonium bellastriatum (Carpenter, 1864)
 Epitonium bellicosum Hedley, 1907
 Epitonium bengalense (E. A. Smith, 1899)
 Epitonium bevdeynzerae Garcia E., 2001
 Epitonium blainei Clench & Turner, 1953
 Epitonium bonaespei (Barnard, 1963)
 Epitonium bouryi (Jousseaume, 1894)
 Epitonium boutetorum Garcia, 2016
 Epitonium brachyspeira Kilburn, 1985
 Epitonium brevissimum (Seguenza, 1876)
 Epitonium bucknilli Powell, 1924
 Epitonium bulbulum (Sowerby II, 1844)
 Epitonium bullatum (Sowerby, 1844)
 Epitonium caamanoi Dall & Bartsch, 1910
 Epitonium calideum (Melvill & Standen, 1903)
 Epitonium californicum Dall, 1917
 Epitonium callipeplum Dall, 1919
 Epitonium candeanum (d’Orbigny, 1842)
 Epitonium candidissimum (Monterosato, 1877)
 Epitonium canna Dall, 1919
 Epitonium cantrainei (Weinkauff, 1866)
 Epitonium carchedon (Iredale, 1936)
 Epitonium castum (A. Adams, 1873)
 Epitonium catalinae Dall, 1908
 Epitonium catalinense Dall, 1917
 Epitonium catanuense (G. B. Sowerby II, 1844)
 Epitonium celesti (Aradas, 1854)
 Epitonium cerdantum (Melvill & Standen, 1903)
 Epitonium championi Clench & Turner, 1952
 Epitonium chiarae Bozzetti, 2007
 Epitonium chinglinae Lee & Wu, 1998
  Epitonium christiani Bozzetti, 2008
 Epitonium christyi (Iredale, 1936)
 Epitonium clathratulum (Kanmacher, 1798)
 Epitonium clathrum Linnaeus, 1758 - common wentletrap
 Epitonium clementinum Grateloup, J.P.S. de, 1840
 Epitonium climacotum Kilburn, 1985
 Epitonium columba Kilburn, 1985
 Epitonium columnella Dall, 1917
 Epitonium commodum (E. A. Smith, 1890)
 Epitonium commutatum Monterosato, 1877
 Epitonium conjunctum (Yokoyama, 1922)
 Epitonium connexum (G. B. Sowerby II, 1844)
 Epitonium continens (Melvill & Standen, 1903)
 Epitonium cookeanum Dall, 1917
 Epitonium cophinodes (Melvill, 1904)
 Epitonium coretum (Iredale, 1936)
 Epitonium corniculum Y.-C. Lee & C.-W. Huang, 2016
 Epitonium coronatum Lamarck, 1816: synonym of Gyroscala coronata (Lamarck, 1816)
 Epitonium coutieri (Jousseaume, 1912)
 Epitonium couturieri (de Boury, 1912)
 Epitonium crassicostatum Gittenberger & Gittenberger, 2005
 Epitonium crassilabrum
 Epitonium crassum (G. B. Sowerby II, 1847)
 Epitonium creberrimum (Hinds, 1843)
 Epitonium crebricostatum Carpenter, 1864
 Epitonium crispatum (Pease, 1863)
 Epitonium crypticorona Kilburn, 1985
 Epitonium cultellicostum (de Boury, 1913)
 Epitonium cumingii (Carpenter, 1856)
 Epitonium curvilineatum (G. B. Sowerby II, 1844)
 Epitonium dallianum (Verrill & Smith, 1880)
 Epitonium deflersi (Jousseaume, 1912)
 Epitonium deificum (Melvill & Standen, 1903)
 Epitonium denticulatum (Sowerby II, 1844) tooth-rib wentletrap
 Epitonium dentiscalpium (Watson, 1883)
 Epitonium deschampsi Garcia, 2003
 Epitonium dubium (G. B. Sowerby II, 1844)
 Epitonium duocamurum Lee Y.C., 2001
 Epitonium durhamianum Hertlein & Strong, 1951
 Epitonium eboreum (E. A. Smith, 1906)
 Epitonium eclecticum (Melvill & Standen, 1903)
 Epitonium elenense (G. B. Sowerby II, 1844)
 Epitonium elisae Bozzetti, 2007
 Epitonium eltanini (Dell, 1990)
 Epitonium emiliae (Melvill & Standen, 1903)
 Epitonium emydonesus Dall, 1917
 Epitonium erroneum (Tapparone-Canefri, 1876)
 Epitonium eulita (Dall & Simpson, 1901)
 Epitonium eusculptum (Sowerby III, 1903)
 Epitonium eutaenium Dall, 1917
 Epitonium evanidstriatum Zelaya & Güller, 2017
 Epitonium eximiellum (Masahito, Kuroda & Habe, 1971)
 Epitonium eximium (A. Adams & Reeve, 1850)
 Epitonium extenuicostum (de Boury, 1913)
 Epitonium fabrizioi Pastorino & Penchaszadeh, 1998
 Epitonium falconi Kilburn, 1985
 Epitonium fasciatum (Sowerby, 1844)
 Epitonium fauroti (Jousseaume, 1912)
 Epitonium fenestratum (Strebel, 1908)
 Epitonium ferminense L. G. Brown, 2019
 Epitonium ferrugineum (Mörch, 1852)
 Epitonium ferussacii (Audouin, 1816)
 Epitonium fischeri (Watson, 1897)
 Epitonium foliaceicosta (d’Orbigny, 1842) - wrinkle-rib wentletrap
 Epitonium fractum Dall, 1927 - humble wentletrap
 Epitonium fragile (Hanley, 1840)
 Epitonium friabile (G. B. Sowerby II, 1844)
 Epitonium frielei (Dall, 1889)
 Epitonium fucatum (Pease, 1861)
 Epitonium fulvovittatum (Dautzenberg, 1890)
 Epitonium georgettinum (Kiener, 1839)
 Epitonium glabratum (Hinds, 1843)
 Epitonium gloriolum (Melvill & Standen, 1901)
 Epitonium godfreyi Cotton, 1938
 Epitonium goldsmithi (DuShane, 1988)
 Epitonium goniophorum (Melvill & Standen, 1903)
 Epitonium gracile (G. B. Sowerby II, 1844)
 Epitonium graciliconfusum Nakayama, 2000
 Epitonium gradaticostatum (Fenaux, 1938)
 Epitonium gradatum (G. B. Sowerby II, 1844)
 Epitonium gradilis (Jousseaume, F.P., 1912)
 Epitonium graviarmatum Gittenberger & Gittenberger, 2005
 Epitonium gravieri (Jousseaume, F.P., 1912)
 Epitonium greenlandicum (Perry, 1811) - Greenland wentletrap
 Epitonium habeli Dall, 1917
 Epitonium hamatulae Preston, 1915
 Epitonium hancocki DuShane, 1970
 Epitonium harimaense Makiyama, 1924
 Epitonium harpa (Jousseaume, 1912)
 Epitonium harpago Kilburn, 1985
 Epitonium hartogi Gittenberger, 2003
 Epitonium hayashii (Habe, 1961)
 Epitonium heloris (Iredale, 1936)
 Epitonium hemmesi DuShane, 1988
 Epitonium hexagonum (G. B. Sowerby II, 1844)
 Epitonium hindsii (Carpenter, 1856)
 Epitonium hispidulum (Monterosato, 1874)
 Epitonium histricosum (Jousseaume, 1912)
 Epitonium hoeksemai Gittenberger, A., Goud & Gittenberger, E., 2000: synonym of Epifungium hoeksemai (A. Gittenberger & Goud, 2000)
 Epitonium hueti Bozzetti, 2011
 Epitonium huffmani DuShane & McLean, 1968
 Epitonium humerosum (Sowerby III, 1901)
 Epitonium humphreysii (Kiener, 1838) - Humphrey's wentletrap
 Epitonium hyalinum (Sowerby, G.B. II, 1844)
 Epitonium idalium (Melvill, 1912)
 Epitonium ilariae Bozzetti, 2007
 Epitonium illovoense (Barnard, 1963)
 Epitonium immaculatum (Sowerby II, 1844)
 Epitonium imperiale (G. B. Sowerby II, 1844)
 Epitonium inaequale (Thiele, 1925)
 Epitonium indianorum (Carpenter, 1865)
 Epitonium indistinctum (G. B. Sowerby II, 1844)
 Epitonium inexpertum L. Brown & Weil, 1999
 Epitonium ingridae Gittenberger, A., Goud & Gittenberger, E., 2000
 Epitonium innesi (Jousseaume, 1912)
 Epitonium interstriatum (G. B. Sowerby, 1905)
 Epitonium irregulare (Sowerby, G.B. II, 1844)
 Epitonium ishimotoi (Masahito & Habe, 1976)
 Epitonium jani Segers, Swinnen & De Prins, 2009
 Epitonium japonicum (Dunker, 1861)
 Epitonium jickelii (Clessin, 1897)
 Epitonium jimpyae Kilburn, 1985
 Epitonium jolyi (Monterosato, 1878)
 Epitonium jomardi (Audouin, J.-V., 1827)
 Epitonium jousseaumei (de Boury, 1886)
 Epitonium juanitae Garcia, 2003
 Epitonium jukesianum (Forbes, 1852)
 Epitonium kastoroae Garcia, 2003
 Epitonium kazusense (Yokoyama, 1922)
 Epitonium kilburni Drivas & Jay, 1989
 Epitonium kiyohimae Nakayama, 2000
 Epitonium klunzingeri (Clessin, 1897)
 Epitonium koshimagani (Nakayama, 1991)
 Epitonium koyamai (Nakayama, 1995)
 Epitonium kraussi (Nyst, 1871)
 Epitonium krebsii (Mörch, 1875) - Krebs' wentletrap
 Epitonium labeo (Jousseaume, 1912)
 Epitonium lachrymulum (Jousseaume, 1912)
 Epitonium lacrima Kilburn, 1985
 Epitonium laidlawi (Melvill & Standen, 1903)
 Epitonium lamellosum (Lamarck, 1822) - lamellose wentletrap
 Epitonium latedis Boury, E.A. de, 1911
 Epitonium latifasciatum (Sowerby II, 1874)
 Epitonium latum Bozzetti, 2009
 Epitonium leali Garcia, 2011
 Epitonium laxatoides Nakayama, 1995
 Epitonium liliputanum (A. Adams, 1861)
 Epitonium linctum (de Boury & Monterosato, 1890)
 Epitonium lineolatum (G. B. Sowerby II, 1844)
 Epitonium lochi Gittenberger, A., Goud & Gittenberger, E., 2000
 Epitonium lowei (Dall, 1906)
 Epitonium luceo (DuShane, 1988)
 Epitonium lyra (Sowerby, 1847)
 Epitonium macleani DuShane, 1970
 Epitonium macromphalus E. A. Smith, 1910
 Epitonium maestratii Garcia E., 2003
 Epitonium malayanum (Thiele, 1925)
 Epitonium malcolmensis (Melvill, 1898)
 Epitonium malhaensis*  (Jousseaume, 1894)
 Epitonium maraisi Kilburn, 1985
 Epitonium margarita (Jousseaume, 1912)
 Epitonium marmoratum (Sowerby II, 1844)
 Epitonium matthewsae Clench & Turner, 1952
 Epitonium melior (Melvill & Standen, 1903)
 Epitonium mellissi (E. A. Smith, 1890)
 Epitonium melvilli (Schepman, 1909)
 Epitonium millecostatum (Pease, 1861)
 Epitonium mindoroense (G. B. Sowerby II, 1844)
 Epitonium minorum (Iredale, 1936)
 Epitonium minutia (Jousseaume, 1912)
 Epitonium minuticostatum (de Boury, 1912)
 Epitonium mirabile Bozzetti, 2008
 Epitonium miserum de Boury, 1913
 Epitonium mitraeforme (G. B. Sowerby II, 1844)
 Epitonium moolenbeeki van Aartsen, 1996
 Epitonium morassii Bonfitto, 2017
 Epitonium mucronatum (Fenaux, 1943)
 Epitonium multicostatum (Sowerby, 1844)
 Epitonium multistriatum (Say, 1826)
 Epitonium mzambanum Kilburn, 1985
 Epitonium nanum (Jeffreys, 1884)
 Epitonium nautlae (Mörch, 1874)
 Epitonium nearense L. G. Brown, 2019
 Epitonium nitidella (Dall, 1889)
 Epitonium nodai Nakayama, 2000
 Epitonium novangliae (Couthouy, 1838) - New England wentletrap
 Epitonium obesum (Sowerby II, 1847)
 Epitonium obliquum (Sowerby, 1844)
 Epitonium obtusum (G. B. Sowerby II, 1844)
 Epitonium occidentale (Nyst, 1871) - fine-ribbed wentletrap
 Epitonium octagonum (G. B. Sowerby, 1905)
 Epitonium okezoko (Habe, 1961) 
 Epitonium oliverioi Bonfitto & Sabelli, 2001
 Epitonium opeas Kilburn, 1985
 Epitonium oppositum (de Boury, 1921)
 Epitonium optabile (A. Adams, 1873)
 Epitonium ossium Nakayama, 2000
 Epitonium ovale (G. B. Sowerby II, 1844)
 Epitonium padangense (Thiele, 1925)
 Epitonium pallasi (Kiener, 1838)
 Epitonium pallidizonatum (Masahito, Kuroda & Habe 1971)
 Epitonium papyracea De Boury
 Epitonium parspeciosum (Iredale, 1929)
 Epitonium parvonatrix Kilburn, 1985
 Epitonium pasiphaes (Melvill, 1912)
 Epitonium paumotense (Pease, 1867)
 Epitonium perangustum (de Boury, 1913)
 Epitonium perfoliatum (Thiele, 1925)
 Epitonium perimense (Jousseaume, 1912)
 Epitonium perlucidum (Jousseaume, 1943)
 Epitonium philippinarum (Sowerby II, 1844)
 Epitonium philtatum (Watson, 1886)
 Epitonium phymanthi Robertson, 1994
 Epitonium pigrum Garcia, 2011
 Epitonium platypleurum (Verco, 1906)
 Epitonium polacia (Dall, 1889)
 Epitonium politum (Sowerby II, 1844)
 Epitonium porrectum (Hinds, 1843)
 Epitonium profundum Nakayama, 2000 
 Epitonium proximum (Thiele, 1925)
 Epitonium pseudonanum Bouchet & Warén, 1986
 Epitonium psomion Kilburn, 1985
 Epitonium pteroen Kilburn, 1977
 Epitonium pulchellum (Bivona, 1832)
 Epitonium pulcherrimum (G. B. Sowerby II, 1844)
 Epitonium pupiforme (Masahito, Kuroda & Habe,1971)
 Epitonium pyramidale (Sowerby II, 1844)
 Epitonium quiquandoni Bozzetti, 2007
 Epitonium raricostatum (Lamarck, 1822)
 Epitonium reflexum (Carpenter, 1856)
 Epitonium regulare (Carpenter, 1857) 
 Epitonium repandior Kilburn, 1985
 Epitonium repandum Kilburn, 1985
 Epitonium replicatum Sowerby, 1844
 Epitonium reticulatum Lee & Wu, 1998
 Epitonium rhips (Watson, 1897)
 Epitonium rimbogai (Masahito & Habe, 1976)
 Epitonium rissoinaeforme (Melvill & Standen, 1903)
 Epitonium robillardi (Sowerby, J. de C., 1894)
 Epitonium rubrolineatum Sowerby, G.B. II, 1844
 Epitonium rupicola (Kurtz, 1860) - brown-banded wentletrap
 Epitonium sakuraii (Kuroda & Habe, 1961)
 Epitonium sallykaicherae Kilburn, 1985
 Epitonium sanctaehelenae (E. A. Smith, 1890)
 Epitonium sandwichense (Nyst, 1871)
 Epitonium santinii Bozzetti, 2007
 Epitonium savignyi Jousseaume, 1912
 Epitonium sawamurai Azuma, 1960
 Epitonium sawinae (Dall, 1903)
 Epitonium scalare (Linnaeus, 1758)
 Epitonium schepmani (Melvill, 1910)
 Epitonium schoedei (Thiele, 1925)
 Epitonium semidisjunctum (Jeffreys, 1884)
 Epitonium sericifila (Dall, 1889) - silky wentletrap
 Epitonium sexcostum (Jousseaume, 1912)
 Epitonium shyorum DuShane & McLean, 1968
 Epitonium simplex (Sowerby, 1894)
 Epitonium skoglundae DuShane, 1974
 Epitonium smithii (Tryon, 1887)
 Epitonium smriglioi Bonfitto, 2010
 Epitonium soroastrae Kilburn, 1985
 Epitonium sousai Bozzetti, 2008
 Epitonium sowerbyanum (Nyst, 1871)
 Epitonium sowerbyi Clessin, 1884
 Epitonium spyridion Kilburn, 1985
 Epitonium stigmaticum (Pilsbry, 1911)
 Epitonium striatellum (Nyst, 1871)
 Epitonium striatissimum (Monterosato, 1878) - frosted wentletrap
 Epitonium subauriculatum (S. M. Souverbie, 1866)
 Epitonium subcastum (E. A. Smith, 1899)
 Epitonium subtile (G. B. Sowerby II, 1844)
 Epitonium suprastriatum (Carpenter, 1857)
 Epitonium sykesii (Melvill & Standen, 1903)
 Epitonium symmetricum (Pease, 1867)
 Epitonium synekhes Kilburn, 1985
 Epitonium syoichiroi Masahito & Habe, 1976
 Epitonium tabogense Dall, 1917
 Epitonium tacitum (Iredale, 1936)
 Epitonium taiwanica Lee & Wu, 1998
 Epitonium tamsinae Kilburn, 1985
 Epitonium tenebrosum (Sowerby, 1903)
 Epitonium tenellum (Hutton, 1885)
 Epitonium tenerum (H. Adams, 1873)
 Epitonium tenue Gray, 1827
 Epitonium tenuicostatum (G. B. Sowerby II, 1844)
 Epitonium tenuiliratum (Sowerby II, 1874)
 Epitonium tenuipicturatum Nakayama, 2000
 Epitonium terebriforme (Thiele, 1925)
 Epitonium textimattum DuShane, 1977
 Epitonium texturatum (Gould, 1847)
 Epitonium thelcterium (Melvill & Standen, 1903)
 Epitonium thorssoni DuShane, 1988
 Epitonium thrasys (Iredale, 1936)
 Epitonium thyraeum Kilburn, 1985
 Epitonium tiberii (de Boury, 1890)
 Epitonium tiburonense Clench & Turner, 1952
 Epitonium tinctorium Dall, 1919
 Epitonium tinctum (Carpenter, 1865) - tinted wentletrap
 Epitonium tokyoense (Kuroda, 1930)
 Epitonium tollini Bartsch, 1938
 Epitonium tomlini (de Boury, 1913)
 Epitonium townsendi (Melvill & Standen, 1903)
 Epitonium trevelyanum (Thompson W., 1840)
 Epitonium trochiforme von Maltzan, 1885
 Epitonium trochoides (de Boury, 1912)
 Epitonium tryoni (de Boury, 1913)
 Epitonium tumidulum (Thiele, 1930)
 Epitonium turritellula (Mörch, 1875)
 Epitonium turtonis (Turton, 1819)
 Epitonium twilae Gittenberger, A., Goud & Gittenberger, E., 2000
 Epitonium umbilicatum (Pease, 1869)
 Epitonium unifasciatum (Sowerby II, 1844) - one-band wentletrap
 Epitonium vaillanti (Jousseaume, 1912)
 Epitonium vallatum (Jousseaume, 1912)
 Epitonium venosum (Sowerby II, 1844)
 Epitonium viaderi Fenaux, 1938
 Epitonium vittatum (Jeffreys, 1884)
 Epitonium vivens Bozzetti, 2009
 Epitonium walkerianum Hertlein & Strong, 1951
 Epitonium webbii (d'Orbigny, 1840)
 Epitonium willetti Strong & Hertlein, 1937
 Epitonium worsfoldi Robertson, 1994
 Epitonium xenicima (Melvill & Standen, 1903)
 Epitonium yamakawana Yokoyama, 1922
 Epitonium yangi L.G. Brown, 2010
 Epitonium yemenita Bonfitto, 2017
 Epitonium yokoyamai Suzuki & Ichikawa, 1936
 Epitonium zabargadense Bonfitto, 2017
 Epitonium zatrephes (Melvill, 1910)
 Epitonium zeteki Dall, 1917

Subgenera and species brought into synonymy
 Epitonium (Asperiscala) de Boury, 1909: synonym of Epitonium Röding, 1798
 Epitonium (Boreoscala) Kobelt, 1902: synonym of Boreoscala Kobelt, 1902
 Epitonium (Clathrus) : synonym of Epitonium Röding, 1798
 Epitonium (Kiiscala) Nakayama, 1995 : synonym of Cycloscala Dall, 1889
 Epitonium delicatulum (Adams H., 1869): synonym of Epitonium tenerum (H. Adams, 1873)

See also
 Wentletrap, an article about the family Epitoniidae.

References

 Gofas, S.; Le Renard, J.; Bouchet, P. (2001). Mollusca. in: Costello, M.J. et al. (eds), European Register of Marine Species: a check-list of the marine species in Europe and a bibliography of guides to their identification. Patrimoines Naturels. 50: 180-213.
 
 Powell A. W. B., New Zealand Mollusca, William Collins Publishers Ltd, Auckland, New Zealand 1979

External links
 Röding P.F. (1798). Museum Boltenianum sive Catalogus cimeliorum e tribus regnis naturæ quæ olim collegerat Joa. Fried Bolten, M. D. p. d. per XL. annos proto physicus Hamburgensis. Pars secunda continens Conchylia sive Testacea univalvia, bivalvia & multivalvia. Trapp, Hamburg. viii, 199 pp.
 Suter H. (1913). Manual of the New Zealand Mollusca with an atlas of quarto plates. Wellington. xxiii + 1120 pp.
 Kilburn R.N. (1985). The family Epitoniidae (Mollusca: Gastropoda) in southern Africa and Mozambique. Annals of the Natal Museum. 27(1): 239-337
 Brown L.G. & Neville B.D. (2015). Catalog of the recent taxa of the families Epitoniidae and Nystiellidae (Mollusca: Gastropoda) with a bibliography of the descriptive and systematic literature. Zootaxa. 3907(1): 1-188
  Serge GOFAS, Ángel A. LUQUE, Joan Daniel OLIVER,José TEMPLADO & Alberto SERRA (2021) - The Mollusca of Galicia Bank (NE Atlantic Ocean); European Journal of Taxonomy 785: 1–114

Epitoniidae